Elsmere is a town in New Castle County, Delaware, United States, bordering the city of Wilmington along Wilmington's western border. According to the 2010 Census, the population of the town is 6,131.

History
Elsmere dates back to 1886 when real estate developer Joshua Heald bought farmland and converted it into houses, building the first suburb in northern Delaware. The community was built at an intersection of railroad lines and allowed working-class families easy access to Wilmington. Trolley lines were later built leading to Elsmere. In 1909, Elsmere was incorporated as a town.

During the 1910s, the Delaware State Fair Association purchased land and built a new fairgrounds within Elsmere's town limit. The grounds, including a racecourse for horses, cars and motorcycles, were located south of New Road and Wilmington Avenue and west of the previously established streets. This land became the site of the Delaware State Fair from 1917 to 1928, and provided a large parking area and ready access from the nearby trolley line. Agricultural exhibits provided the backbone of the fair, but in addition to the races, the summer attraction also included horse and dog shows, vaudeville acts, music, and fireworks. After 1928, the State Fair had moved to Harrington, but the grandstand and the races remained until 1943, when the property was converted to land for residential housing.

In 1950, a 336-bed Veteran's Administration hospital opened on the western edge of town. This was the ninth VA hospital built after the conclusion of World War II.

Geography
Elsmere is located at  (39.7392796, –75.5979812).

Elsmere is 1.5 miles away from Wilmington

Climate
The climate in this area is characterized by hot, humid summers and generally mild to cool winters. According to the Köppen Climate Classification system, Elsmere has a humid subtropical climate, abbreviated "Cfa" on climate maps.

Demographics

As of the census of 2000, there were 5,800 people, 2,299 households, and 1,487 families residing in the town. The racial makeup of the town was 82.41% White, 9.45% African American, 0.22% Native American, 0.97% Asian, 5.10% from other races, and 1.84% from two or more races. Hispanic or Latino of any race were 12.09% of the population.

There were 2,299 households, out of which 31.2% had children under the age of 18 living with them, 42.5% were married couples living together, 16.4% had a female householder with no husband present, and 35.3% were non-families. 28.5% of all households were made up of individuals, and 11.5% had someone living alone who was 65 years of age or older. The average household size was 2.52 and the average family size was 3.09.

In the town, the population was spread out, with 25.1% under the age of 18, 9.5% from 18 to 24, 31.1% from 25 to 44, 19.7% from 45 to 64, and 14.7% who were 65 years of age or older. The median age was 36 years. For every 100 females, there were 96.0 males. For every 100 females age 18 and over, there were 91.8 males.

The median income for a household in the town was $39,415, and the median income for a family was $46,357. Males had a median income of $35,427 versus $28,089 for females. The per capita income for the town was $18,643. About 6.7% of families and 8.9% of the population were below the poverty line, including 11.8% of those under age 18 and 8.6% of those age 65 or over.

Government

Elsmere has a mayor-council system of government consisting of a Mayor and a six-member Town Council, with Town Council members elected by district. As of 2022, the Mayor is Eric Scott Thompson while the Town Council consists of Marianne Skipski (1st District), Sally Jensen (2nd District), Mary Steppi (3rd District), Charles McKewen (4th District), Joann Personti (5th District), and Drew DiBiaso (6th District).

Police services in the town is provided by the Elsmere Police Department, which consists of a Chief of Police, Administrative Assistant, Lieutenant, two Patrol Sergeants, Sr. CPL, CPL, two PFCs, and three Patrolmen. Fire protection in the town is provided by the Elsmere Fire Company No. 1, which was founded in 1921.

Mayors

Eric Thompson 2018-Present

Steven Burg 2015-2018

Deborah Norkavage 2007-2015

Edward Doyle 2001-2007

And Patti Belvins 1985-1990

And James Abbott 1978-1985

And Joseph Walling 1957-1971

Richard Holmes 1954-1957

Parks and recreation
Elsmere is home to multiple small neighborhood parks. Parks in Elsmere include Junction Street Park, Fairgrounds Park, Joseph R. Walling Park, Maple Avenue Park, Brian Martin Park, Vilone Park, and Veterans Park. The town is also home to Elsmere Bark Park, which is a dog park.

Education
The town of Elsmere is served by the Red Clay Consolidated School District for public education. The school district maintains one school in the town: Austin D. Baltz Elementary School (Grades K through 5). Public school students in Elsmere in grades 6 through 8 attend Alexis I. duPont Middle School in Greenville while students in grades 9 through 12 attend Thomas McKean High School northwest of Elsmere near Hockessin.

The Diocese of Wilmington operates All Saints Catholic School (PreK through 8).  Formally known as Corpus Christi School, All Saints is a merge of Corpus Christi, St. Matthew School, St. Catherine of Siena, and Our Lady of Fatima.

Infrastructure

Transportation

The main east–west road in Elsmere is Delaware Route 2 (Kirkwood Highway), which heads east to Wilmington and west to Newark. Delaware Route 100 (Dupont Road) runs north–south through the eastern part of Elsmere. Delaware Route 141 passes to the west of Elsmere, with access to the town via an interchange with DE 2 in Prices Corner. DE 141 heads south through Newport and provides access to Interstate 95, Interstate 295, and Interstate 495. DART First State provides bus service to Elsmere along Route 6, which follows Kirkwood Highway and heads east to Wilmington station, which is served by Amtrak and SEPTA Regional Rail's Wilmington/Newark Line, and west to the Newark Transit Hub. Freight trains pass through Elsmere along CSX Transportation's Philadelphia Subdivision line and East Penn Railroad's Wilmington & Northern line, both of which interchange at Elsmere Junction. CSX Transportation operates the Wilsmere Yard to the south of Elsmere near the former Wilmington Assembly plant used by General Motors.

Utilities
Delmarva Power, a subsidiary of Exelon, provides electricity and natural gas to Elsmere. Artesian Water Company, a subsidiary of Artesian Resources, provides water to Elsmere. Sewer service in Elsmere is provided by New Castle County. Trash and recycling collection in Elsmere is provided under contract by Waste Management.

Health care
Elsmere is home to the Wilmington VA Medical Center, a veterans hospital operated by the Veterans Health Administration. Hospitals near Elsmere include Wilmington Hospital and St. Francis Hospital in Wilmington and Christiana Hospital in Christiana.

Notable people
 Bill Hawke, former MLB pitcher for the St. Louis Cardinals and Baltimore Orioles
 Francis D. Vavala, General, Delaware National Guard
Patricia Blevins, Former mayor of Elsmere and President pro tempore of the Delaware Senate

References

External links

Town of Elsmere

Towns in New Castle County, Delaware
Towns in Delaware